The Nernst–Planck equation is a conservation of mass equation used to describe the motion of a charged chemical species in a fluid medium. It extends Fick's law of diffusion for the case where the diffusing particles are also moved with respect to the fluid by electrostatic forces. It is named after Walther Nernst and Max Planck.

Equation
The Nernst–Planck equation is a continuity equation for the time-dependent concentration  of a chemical species:

where  is the flux. It is assumed that the total flux is composed of three elements: diffusion, advection, and electromigration. This implies that the concentration is affected by an ionic concentration gradient , flow velocity , and an electric field :

The electric field may be further decomposed as:

Therefore, the Nernst–Planck equation is given by:

Simplifications 
Assuming that the concentration is at equilibrium  and the flow velocity is zero, meaning that only the ion species moves, the Nernst–Planck equation takes the form:

Rather than a general electric field, if we assume that only the electrostatic component is significant, the equation is further simplified by removing the time derivative of the magnetic vector potential:

Finally, in units of mol/(m2·s) and the gas constant , one obtains the more familiar form:

Applications 
The Nernst–Planck equation is applied in describing the ion-exchange kinetics in soils. It has also been applied to membrane electrochemistry.

See also
Goldman–Hodgkin–Katz equation
Bioelectrochemistry

References

Walther Nernst
Diffusion
Physical chemistry
Electrochemical equations
Statistical mechanics
Max Planck
Transport phenomena
Electrochemistry